Spaghettieis, or spaghetti ice cream, is a German ice cream dish made to resemble a plate of spaghetti. In the dish, vanilla ice cream is extruded through a modified Spätzle press or potato ricer, giving it the appearance of spaghetti. It is then placed over whipped cream and topped with strawberry sauce (to simulate tomato sauce) and either coconut flakes, grated almonds, or white chocolate shavings to represent the parmesan cheese. Besides the usual dish with strawberry sauce, one may also find variations like ice cream with dark chocolate and nuts, simulating Spaghetti Carbonara instead of Spaghetti Bolognese.

History 
Fontanella recalls serving his innovative creation to children who broke into tears because they wanted ice cream and not a plate of spaghetti. He received the "Bloomaulorden", a medal bestowed by the city of Mannheim, in 2014.

For many years, the dish was not well known outside Germany, and could only be found at some gelaterias and specialty ice cream parlors, special events, and hotels and restaurants around the world. Recently, Spaghettieis has begun to appear as a novelty in more restaurants and has had some attention on social media.

References 

German desserts
Ice cream
German words and phrases
Metaphors referring to spaghetti